The Perfect Picture is a Ghanaian movie produced and written by Shirley Frimpong-Manso in 2009.

Plot
In what seems like a perfect life, three beautiful women who are pushing thirty make bold attempts to change their lives even when destiny plays its joke on them. With a marriage that seems almost doomed from the beginning, to an affair with an unlikely candidate and the endless pursuit of love, three friends will learn the harsh lessons of life, the challenges of marriage, the fatality of falling in love and the rewards of having a good laugh in the mist of sorrow.
The Perfect Picture offers a colorful and humorous insight into a world where everything is as perfect as your life and that of your friends.

Cast
 Jackie Appiah
 Lydia Forson
 Naa Ashorkor Doku-Mensah
 Adjetey Anang

References

Ghanaian comedy-drama films
2000s English-language films
English-language Ghanaian films